Timothy Drummond (born 5 March 1988) is a South African field hockey player who plays as a midfielder for Dutch club HDM and the South African national team.

At the 2012 Summer Olympics, he competed for the national team in the men's tournament. Drummond was educated at Hilton College.

Club career
Drummond spent several years in England playing at Henley Hockey Club. In 2011 he joined SCHC in the Netherlands where he played for two seasons.  He also played for Klein Zwitserland in the Dutch Hoofdklasse. He left Klein Zwitserland in the summer of 2021 for HDM in the Dutch second division.

References

External links

1988 births
Living people
Field hockey players from Cape Town
South African people of British descent
South African male field hockey players
Male field hockey midfielders
Olympic field hockey players of South Africa
Field hockey players at the 2012 Summer Olympics
2014 Men's Hockey World Cup players
Field hockey players at the 2014 Commonwealth Games
Field hockey players at the 2018 Commonwealth Games
2018 Men's Hockey World Cup players
Field hockey players at the 2020 Summer Olympics
Commonwealth Games competitors for South Africa
Delhi Waveriders players
Hockey India League players
SCHC players
HC Klein Zwitserland players
Men's Hoofdklasse Hockey players
Haagsche Delftsche Mixed players
Expatriate field hockey players
South African expatriate sportspeople in the Netherlands
Alumni of Hilton College (South Africa)
Field hockey players at the 2022 Commonwealth Games
21st-century South African people